The Dome at Crown Perth (originally the Burswood Superdome and formerly the Burswood Dome) was a multipurpose indoor arena used for sports and entertainment. It was a venue for indoor sports, notably the Hopman Cup tennis tournament, which was moved to the Perth Arena for the 2013 and future events, and for pop music concerts. Many notable artists performed there, the record attendance being 20,000 for Cliff Richard & The Shadows. Other performers since 1987 have included AC/DC, Kiss, U2, Mick Jagger, Michael Jackson, Gloria Estefan, Mariah Carey, Pink, Lady Gaga, Kylie Minogue, Elton John, Iron Maiden, Britney Spears, Beyoncé, The Black Eyed Peas, Guns N' Roses, Florence and the Machine, George Michael, Christina Aguilera, Delta Goodrem, Gwen Stefani, Justin Bieber, Coldplay, Taylor Swift, Linkin Park, Rihanna, Roger Waters and Top Gear Live. It was the hosting venue for the Hopman Cup from 1989 until 2012.

As a sports venue, the Dome was the home of the Hopman Cup and occasionally hosted Perth Wildcats' National Basketball League games. At one time the dome was also considered as a possible home venue for the A-League's Perth Glory while renovations were taking place at their usual home, Perth Oval, though the Glory eventually decided to stay at the Oval rather than play inside the Dome on an artificial surface. The Dome was also the venue used for World Wrestling Entertainment (WWE) shows in Perth while on their Australian tours.

, firm plans for Crown's major new hotel development and for a state-controlled Perth Stadium on nearby land have ensured that the dome will be removed, probably to provide an additional  of car parking. Government approval for demolition was granted on 31 May 2012, and demolition works started in July 2013 with the land to be used for 1000 car parking bays. The roof was deflated on 28 June 2013.

References

Sports venues demolished in 2013
Tennis venues in Australia
Sports venues in Perth, Western Australia
Defunct National Basketball League (Australia) venues
Defunct basketball venues in Australia
Defunct indoor arenas in Australia
Boxing venues in Australia
Burswood, Western Australia
Netball venues in Western Australia
Perth Wildcats